Ding Yi (Chinese: 丁㇠; born 1962) is a Chinese contemporary artist currently based in Shanghai. He is a pivotal figure in the development of geometric abstraction in China, and is currently a professor at the Shanghai Institute of Visual Arts.

Early life 
Ding Yi grew up during the Cultural Revolution. He studied in the art program at your middle school, and the art education he received in Shanghai was in general not systematic. The uniquely nonlinear curriculum included making bricks for bomb shelters, drawing propaganda posters, performing in public spaces, and studying design and Chinese ink painting. He studied decorative design at the Shanghai School of Arts and Crafts from 1980 to 1983, and then went on to major in Chinese ink painting in the art program of Shanghai University from 1986 to 1990. He also took part in a number of art exhibitions in 1985 and 1986.

Career 
Ding Yi's enduring method of incorporating crosses into his work emerged in the late 1980s. He executed a series of painting experiments called Appearance of Crosses, in which the artist adopted the shapes of x and + as a recurring motif with the intention of combining painting and design into a single form of expression. The cross, whether a + or an x, is a motif that the artist has declared as a formal mark without meaning, while the context of this work is the industrial-paced development of the urban environment in post-socialist China. His perennial idiom —-- the grid —-- speaks to a context in place and time, through its association with the frenetic communications networks and distinctive fluorescence of the contemporary city.

Style 
The majority of his work features repetitions of the sign superimposed in different layers, colors, and rotations; the tiny, manually painted symbols cover the entire surface of large canvases, requiring a painstaking amount of precision and technical skill. By applying extremely rational design elements, Ding sought to “make painting that was not like painting,” and for the past thirty years he has exclusively and relentlessly executed abstract paintings with shapes of small cross. The majority of his work features repetitions of the plus sign superimposed in different layers, colors, and rotations; the tiny, manually painted symbols cover the entire surface of large canvases, requiring a painstaking amount of precision and technical skill.

Institutional solo exhibitions 

2018 十×30 Years — Ding Yi's Works, Guangdong Museum of Art, Guangzhou
2017 Appearance of Crosses: A Chronicle, Xi'an Art Museum, Xi'an
2017 Appearance of Crosses, Sean Scully Studio, London, UK
2016 Ding Yi-Art Unlimited, Art Basel 2016, Booth Nr. U54, Basel, Switzerland
2016 Re-Appearance of Crosses, Ding Yi Solo Show, Hubei Museum of Art, Wuhan, Hubei
2015 Ding Yi: What's Left to Appear, Long Museum (West Bund), Shanghai
2013 2013 Art Changsha, Changsha City Museum, Hunan Province
2011 Specific Abstracted, Ding Yi Solo Exhibition, Minsheng Art Museum, Shanghai
2008 Appearance of Crosses from 1989 to 2007, Solo Exhibition of Ding Yi, Museo d'Arte Moderna di Bologna, Bologna, Italy

Museum collections 
His works are included in the collections of:
Pacific Asia Museum at University of Southern California, U.S.A. 
Guangdong Museum of Art, Guangzhou, Guangdong 
Hubei Museum of Art, Wuhan, Hubei 
Chengdu Museum of Contemporary Art, Chengdu, Sichuan 
The National Art Museum of China, Beijing 
K11 Art Foundation, Hong Kong, China 
Sonje Museum of Contemporary Art, Gyeongju, Korea; 
University of Sydney Art Collection, Sydney, Australia 
Chinese Modern Art Foundation, Ghent, Belgium 
Ashmolean Museum, University of Oxford, UK
Leeum, Samsung Museum of Art, Seoul, Korea
Centre Pompidou, Paris, France
M+ Museum, Hong Kong
Long Museum, Shanghai
Shanghai Art Museum, Shanghai
Hammer Museum, Gift of the Haudenschild Collection, Los Angeles, U.S.A.
Fukuoka Asian Art Museum, Fukuoka, Japan
Uli Sigg Collection, Switzerland.

References 

Living people
Chinese contemporary artists
Painters from Shanghai
1962 births
Shanghai University alumni